Anna Lourdes Ramírez Sarti (born June 11, 1984, in Guatemala City) is a female beach volleyball player from Guatemala, who played in the 2007 Pan American Games playing with María Orellana finishing ninth.

She has participated in many tournaments at the NORCECA Beach Volleyball Circuit.

She represented her native country during the 2006 Central American and Caribbean Games playing with María Orellana; they finished in the seventh position.

She won the National Championship 2009, playing with María Orellana.

She played Indoor Volleyball with her National Team at the 2006 World Championship qualifier. Her team finished fourth, not qualifying for the World Championship.

References

 
 World Championship Qualifier 2006 Guatemala Team

1984 births
Living people
Sportspeople from Guatemala City
Guatemalan beach volleyball players
Women's beach volleyball players
Pan American Games competitors for Guatemala
Beach volleyball players at the 2007 Pan American Games
Beach volleyball players at the 2011 Pan American Games
Competitors at the 2006 Central American and Caribbean Games